Lake Alcacocha (possibly from Quechua allqa black-and-white qucha lake) is a lake in Peru located in the Junín Region, Junín Province, Junín District. Alcacocha lies east of Lake Junín.

See also 
 Antaqucha

References 

Lakes of Peru
Lakes of Junín Region